Carex glareosa is a species of flowering plant belonging to the family Cyperaceae.

Its native range is Northern Europe to Sakhalin, Alaska to Canada.

References

glareosa